The 1971–72 New York Knicks season was the 26th season for the team in the National Basketball Association (NBA). The Knicks compiled a 48–34 record in the regular season to finish second in the Atlantic Division and earn a berth in the NBA Playoffs for the sixth consecutive year. New York had acquired Earl Monroe in a trade with the Baltimore Bullets in November 1971.

In the first round of the playoffs, New York faced the Baltimore Bullets, who had defeated the Knicks in the Eastern Conference Finals the previous year. The Knicks won the series in six games and advanced to the conference finals, where they faced the Boston Celtics. With a 4–1 series victory, New York made the NBA Finals for the second time in three seasons. In the Finals, the Knicks were opposed by the Los Angeles Lakers, whom they had beaten in the 1970 NBA Finals. After winning Game 1 of the Finals 114–92 in Los Angeles, the Knicks lost the next four games and the series. Willis Reed only played 11 games in the regular season and missed the entirety of the playoffs with a knee injury.

Draft picks

Roster

Regular season

Season standings

z – clinched division title
y – clinched division title
x – clinched playoff spot

Record vs. opponents

Game log

Playoffs

|- align="center" bgcolor="#ffcccc"
| 1
| March 31
| @ Baltimore
| L 105–108 (OT)
| Walt Frazier (31)
| Jerry Lucas (14)
| Walt Frazier (6)
| Baltimore Civic Center12,289
| 0–1
|- align="center" bgcolor="#ccffcc"
| 2
| April 2
| Baltimore
| W 110–88
| Walt Frazier (30)
| Dave DeBusschere (14)
| Walt Frazier (9)
| Madison Square Garden19,588
| 1–1
|- align="center" bgcolor="#ffcccc"
| 3
| April 4
| @ Baltimore
| L 103–104
| Earl Monroe (28)
| Jerry Lucas (12)
| Bill Bradley (5)
| Baltimore Civic Center12,289
| 1–2
|- align="center" bgcolor="#ccffcc"
| 4
| April 6
| Baltimore
| W 104–98
| Bill Bradley (25)
| Dave DeBusschere (13)
| Walt Frazier (8)
| Madison Square Garden19,588
| 2–2
|- align="center" bgcolor="#ccffcc"
| 5
| April 9
| @ Baltimore
| W 106–82
| Lucas, Monroe (20)
| Jerry Lucas (16)
| Jerry Lucas (6)
| Baltimore Civic Center10,244
| 3–2
|- align="center" bgcolor="#ccffcc"
| 6
| April 11
| Baltimore
| W 107–101
| Lucas, Frazier (22)
| Jerry Lucas (12)
| Frazier, Monroe (5)
| Madison Square Garden19,588
| 4–2
|-

|- align="center" bgcolor="#ccffcc"
| 1
| April 13
| @ Boston
| W 116–94
| Walt Frazier (36)
| Jerry Lucas (11)
| Jerry Lucas (8)
| Boston Garden14,292
| 1–0
|- align="center" bgcolor="#ccffcc"
| 2
| April 16
| Boston
| W 106–105
| Dave DeBusschere (24)
| Dave DeBusschere (17)
| three players tied (4)
| Madison Square Garden19,588
| 2–0
|- align="center" bgcolor="#ffcccc"
| 3
| April 19
| @ Boston
| L 109–115
| Bill Bradley (29)
| Dave DeBusschere (12)
| Dave DeBusschere (6)
| Boston Garden15,315
| 2–1
|- align="center" bgcolor="#ccffcc"
| 4
| April 21
| Boston
| W 116–98
| Earl Monroe (26)
| Dave DeBusschere (16)
| Jerry Lucas (7)
| Madison Square Garden19,588
| 3–1
|- align="center" bgcolor="#ccffcc"
| 5
| April 23
| @ Boston
| W 111–103
| Dave DeBusschere (24)
| Frazier, DeBusschere (11)
| Walt Frazier (7)
| Boston Garden15,315
| 4–1
|-

|- align="center" bgcolor="#ccffcc"
| 1
| April 26
| @ Los Angeles
| W 114–92
| Bill Bradley (29)
| Dave DeBusschere (18)
| Walt Frazier (11)
| The Forum17,505
| 1–0
|- align="center" bgcolor="#ffcccc"
| 2
| April 30
| @ Los Angeles
| L 92–106
| Walt Frazier (21)
| Lucas, Jackson (11)
| Walt Frazier (7)
| The Forum17,505
| 1–1
|- align="center" bgcolor="#ffcccc"
| 3
| May 3
| Los Angeles
| L 96–107
| Walt Frazier (25)
| Jerry Lucas (14)
| Jerry Lucas (6)
| Madison Square Garden19,588
| 1–2
|- align="center" bgcolor="#ffcccc"
| 4
| May 5
| Los Angeles
| L 111–116 (OT)
| Bill Bradley (26)
| Dave DeBusschere (13)
| Jerry Lucas (11)
| Madison Square Garden19,588
| 1–3
|- align="center" bgcolor="#ffcccc"
| 5
| May 7
| @ Los Angeles
| L 100–114
| Walt Frazier (31)
| Dave DeBusschere (14)
| Walt Frazier (10)
| The Forum17,505
| 1–4
|-

Awards and records
Walt Frazier, All-NBA First Team
Walt Frazier, NBA All-Defensive First Team
Dave DeBusschere, NBA All-Defensive First Team

References

Bibliography

External links
 Knicks on Basketball Reference
 1972 NBA Playoff Summary

New York
New York Knicks seasons
Eastern Conference (NBA) championship seasons
New York Knicks
New York Knicks
1970s in Manhattan
Madison Square Garden